Gladigau is a village and a former municipality in the district of Stendal, in Saxony-Anhalt, Germany. Since 1 July 2009, it is part of the town Osterburg (Altmark).

Former municipalities in Saxony-Anhalt
Osterburg (Altmark)